Nikolai Toporkoff (1885–1965) was a Russian Empire-born French cinematographer. Toporkoff fled his homeland following the 1917 Russian Revolution, moving to France where he shot around seventy films including the 1927 historical The Loves of Casanova.

Selected filmography
 The House of Mystery (1923)
 Le Brasier ardent (1923)
 Heart of an Actress (1924)
 The Loves of Casanova (1927)
 Secrets of the Orient (1928)
 The Model from Montparnasse (1929)
 The Adjutant of the Czar (1929)
 Troika (1930)
 The White Devil (1930)
 Nights of Princes (1930)
 The Mystery of the Yellow Room (1930)
 La Femme d'une nuit (1931)
 Suzanne (1932)
 Take Care of Amelie (1932)
 Sergeant X (1932)
 600,000 Francs a Month (1933)
 Let's Touch Wood (1933)
 The Red Dancer (1937)
 Ramuntcho (1938)
 Vidocq (1939)
 Camp Thirteen (1940)
 The White Truck (1943)
 The Last Judgment (1945)
 Third at Heart (1947)
 My Seal and Them (1951)
 My Friend Oscar (1951)
 Alone in the World (1952)
 The Unfrocked One (1954)
 Leguignon the Healer (1954)

References

Bibliography 
 Klossner, Michael. The Europe of 1500-1815 on film and television. McFarland & Co, 2002.

External links 
 

1885 births
1965 deaths
French cinematographers
Mass media people from Moscow
People who emigrated to escape Bolshevism
Emigrants from the Russian Empire to France